The 2017 West Georgia Wolves football team represented the University of West Georgia in the 2017 NCAA Division II football season. They were led by first-year head coach David Dean. The Wolves played their home games at University Stadium and were members of the Gulf South Conference.

Schedule
West Georgia announced its 2017 football schedule on February 14, 2017. The schedule consists of 7 home and 4 away games in the regular season. The Wolves will host GSC foes North Alabama, Shorter, Valdosta State, and West Florida, and will travel to Delta State, Florida Tech, Mississippi College, and West Alabama.

The Wolves will host all three non-conference game against Fort Valley State, Albany State and Miles, which all three are from the Southern Intercollegiate Athletic Conference.

Rankings

References

West Georgia
West Georgia Wolves football seasons
West Georgia Wolves football